Aristarchus or Aristarch ( Aristarkhos), "a Macedonian of Thessalonica" (Acts 27:2), was an early Christian mentioned in a few passages of the New Testament. He accompanied Saint Paul on his journey to Rome. Along with Gaius, another Roman Macedonian, Aristarchus was seized by the mob at Ephesus and taken into the theater (Acts 19:29). Later, Aristarchus returned with Paul from Greece to Asia. At Caesarea, he embarked with Paul on a ship of Edremit (Adramyttium) bound for Myra in Lycia; whether he traveled with him from there to Rome is not recorded.

Background
In Eastern Orthodox and Eastern Catholic tradition, Aristarchus is identified as one of the Seventy Apostles and bishop of Apamea.  He is commemorated as a saint and martyr on January 4, April 14, and September 27.  He is mentioned in the Roman Martyrology on August 4.

Aristarchus son of Aristarchus, a politarch of Thessalonica (39/38 BC?)
may be the same person with Aristarchus.

References

External links
Smith's Bible Dictionary, "Aristarchus"

Seventy disciples
People in Acts of the Apostles
People in the Pauline epistles
1st-century bishops in the Roman Empire
Saints of Roman Thessalonica
Christian saints from the New Testament
Politarchs of Roman Thessalonica
Apamea, Syria